This article documents the discography for American country music artist Deborah Allen.

Studio albums

Compilation albums

Extended plays

Singles

Christmas singles

Music videos

References 

Country music discographies
Discographies of American artists